Patricia Secrest is a former American Republican politician who served in the Missouri House of Representatives.

Born in Ann Arbor, Michigan, she attended University of Missouri and Washington University in St. Louis.  In 2004, she ran to become lieutenant governor of Missouri, but she was defeated in the Republican primary by Peter Kinder.  Secrest grew up in southwest Missouri and previously worked as a public school teacher and small business owner.

References

20th-century American politicians
21st-century American politicians
20th-century American women politicians
21st-century American women politicians
Republican Party members of the Missouri House of Representatives
Living people
Women state legislators in Missouri
Year of birth missing (living people)
University of Missouri alumni
Washington University in St. Louis alumni